Medea is a 1969 Italian film directed by Pier Paolo Pasolini, based on the ancient myth of Medea. Filmed in Göreme Open Air Museum's early Christian churches, Pisa, and the Citadel of Aleppo, it stars opera singer Maria Callas in her only film role. She does not sing in the movie.

The film is largely a faithful portrayal of the myth of Jason and the Argonauts and the events of Euripides' play The Medea concerning the betrayal of Medea by Jason and his eventual demise at her hands.

The film was received positively by critics but did not receive commercial success. According to film commentator Tony Rayns the film represents a committedly adversarial piece of art from the director who loved to challenge society. Rayns calls the film "a love song to Maria Callas" and describes the ending as "backing him (Pasolini) into a cul-de-sac" for the dark ending of the film which almost seems like a resignation from cultural production. Indeed, Pasolini's dramatic and adverse personality is very much alive in this film which depicts Medea's murder of her husband, children and her husband's lover.

Plot

In the city of Iolcus in Greece, King Aeson is removed from power by his half-brother Pelias who becomes a cruel tyrant mad with power. Jason, Aeson's son, is sent to the centaur Chiron to be hidden away where Pelias cannot get him. A powerful relic is collected in Colchis, which used to belong to Phrixus. The golden skin had belonged to a sacred goat sent by the gods to save the boy and his sister Helle from certain death. The goat has flown the boy across the Dardanelles to Colchis though losing the girl along the way. Phrixus and the goat have arrived in Colchis, where Phyrsus is sacrificed, and the goat is skinned. The skin is given as a gift to the god of war, Ares.

In the film's prologue, the centaur Chiron teaches the young boy Jason about the world and tells him about the voyage he will one day embark on to Colchis. The land of Colchis houses the Golden Fleece and is home to many bizarre rituals, like human sacrifice. This sacrifices are presided over by Queen Medea. Jason grows up, travels to Iolcus and challenges Pelias to the throne. Pelias says he can have the kingdom if he retrieves the Golden Fleece from Colchis on the other side of the world. Jason assents. Meanwhile, Medea has a vision of Jason and is so enraptured with him that she asks her brother Absyrtus to help steal the fleece in preparation for his arrival.

They travel far into the wilderness, where they eventually join the Argonauts who have been marching to Colchis. The King and the Colchians realize that the fleece has been stolen from under them. They pursue Medea and intend to retrieve the fleece. Medea realizes that the Colchians are chasing them, and so she kills her brother and dismembers his body so that they are forced to stop and collect his remains. Her father's men then halt and retrieve the scattered pieces of his son's body, enabling Jason and Medea to escape. After collecting the parts of his dead son, the King returns to Colchis, where he has a burial ceremony performed for his son to soothe his crying wife. Meanwhile, Medea returns with the Argonauts to Greece, where she has a spiritual crisis after realizing how completely alien Greek practices are from the rituals of her eastern homeland.

When they return to Iolcus, they deliver the fleece to Pelias, who reneges on his promise. Deciding the fleece has little power, Jason accepts this decision. Medea is stripped of her ornate ethnic garb and dressed in the garments of a traditional Greek housewife. Jason dismisses the Argonauts, and after spending the night making love to Medea, he decides to head for the city of Corinth. In Corinth, Jason sees a vision of two centaurs, Chiron, the centaur who raised him, and one "newer" human version of Chiron. Only the newer human Chiron is permitted to speak as the older one's dialogue would be incomprehensible to Jason. Chiron has a philosophical dialogue with Jason and tells him that Medea is torn between her past ritualistic self, the self that performed the human rituals in Colchis, and the new less spiritual Greek self. Medea bears Jason's two sons, though Jason grows more and more distant from her. He grows tired of Medea and decides to pursue a political marriage to a Corinthian princess, Glauce. Creusa's father, Creon, is afraid of Medea's wrath, particularly her dark magic. He has her exiled from his land because he is afraid for his daughter, who is not to blame for Jason's fickle heart.

The enraged Medea plots revenge against Jason and his new bride. She is driven by the words of Creon and of her own handmaidens, who view her as a dark sorceress. She calls for Jason and pretends to be happy and accepting of his new marriage. She tells Jason that her one wish is that the King does not banish her two loving children, which she has born to Jason. Jason accepts and goes to Creon to ask that of him.

Meanwhile, Medea asks her children to send Glauce a robe bewitched with magic herbs. Although Medea intends for the poison to cause the princess and her father, Creon, to burst into flames, Glauce sees a reflection of Medea in her mirror and feels all her agony. She rushes to the city's walls, where she commits suicide by plunging over the side to her death. The King runs after her and is so moved to grief that he commits suicide as well.

Medea is driven into a frenzy, kills her and Jason's sons, and sets fire to their house. Held back by the fire, Jason pleads with Medea to give the children a proper burial. She refuses from the midst of the flames: "It is useless! Nothing is possible anymore!"

Cast
 Maria Callas as Medea
 Massimo Girotti as Creon
 Laurent Terzieff as Chiron the centaur
 Giuseppe Gentile as Jason
 Margareth Clémenti as Glauce
 Paul Jabara as Pelias
 Gerard Weiss as Second centaur
 Sergio Tramonti as Apsirto, Medea's brother
 Luigi Barbini	as an Argonaut
 Gian Paolo Durgar	
 Luigi Masironi as	Jason at age 5
 Michelangelo Masironi	as Jason at age 13
 Gianni Brandizi as an Argonaut
 Franco Jacobbi as an Argonaut
 Annamaria Chio as Wet-nurse 
 Piera Degli Esposti		
 Mirella Pamphili
 Graziella Chiarcossi as Glauce's maid

Relation to Euripides' play
The film does not use the dialogue written by Euripides but the plot does closely follow the structure of his play. The beginning portions of the film also follow the early life of Jason and his voyage to Colchis where he meets Medea.

Score
For the score, Pasolini chose music from various Eastern cultures because prehistoric music was not re-creatable. According to musicologist Jon Solomon from The Sound of Cinematic Antiquity: “For the rituals in Colchis he (Pasolini) selected Tibetan chant for the elders, Persian santur music for general Colchian atmosphere, and Balkan choral music, characterized by a female chorus doubling in two parts a second apart, for the women promoting the growth of new crops with the blood of the young victim of sparagmos, the Greek Dionysiac ritual of dismemberment.” I believe I also heard Japanese traditional music during the screening.

Filming locations
The film was shot between May 1969 - August 1969.

Citadel of Aleppo, Aleppo, Syria as Corinth, Greece
Grado, Gorizia, Friuli-Venezia Giulia, Italy as the King of Corinth's residence
Göreme Open Air Museum, Göreme, Nevsehir Province, Turkey as Temple of the Golden fleece in Colchis
Cappadocia, Turkey as Colchis
Lido Marechiaro, Anzio, Rome, Lazio, Italy as Corinth, Greece
Viterbo, Lazio, Italy
Piazza dei Miracoli, Pisa, Tuscany, Italy
Cinecittà Studios, Rome, Lazio, Italy as miscellaneous interiors

Home video release
The film was released on Blu-ray in Region 2 by the British Film Institute and was also made available on the BFI Player streaming service.

See also
 List of historical drama films
 Greek mythology in popular culture

References

External links

Callas as Medea

1969 films
1960s fantasy drama films
Italian fantasy drama films
Filicide in fiction
Films directed by Pier Paolo Pasolini
Films shot in Syria
Films shot in Italy
Films shot in Turkey
Films based on Medea (Euripides play)
1969 drama films
Films set in Greece
Films about infidelity
Infidelity in fiction
Films about families
Films about racism
Films shot in Rome
Films set in Georgia (country)
1960s Italian-language films
Iolcus in fiction
1960s Italian films